The Cleveland County Clerk's Building is a modest one-story wood-frame structure now located on the Cleveland County fairgrounds in Rison, Arkansas. It served as the office of the county clerk until about 1911, when the courthouse was completed. It was then rented to the local sheriff for personal use, and from 1921 to 1940 housed an office of the local agricultural extension service.

In 1941 the building was moved to a site in Rison's business district.  It was used for a variety of commercial and professional purposes until 1975, when the Cleveland County Historical Society had the building moved to the fairgrounds.  There it serves as one of a collection of historic structures intended to depict a typical 19th-century Arkansas village.

The building was listed on the National Register of Historic Places in 1976.

See also
Mount Olivet Methodist Church, also part of the fairgrounds village collection
National Register of Historic Places listings in Cleveland County, Arkansas

References

Government buildings on the National Register of Historic Places in Arkansas
Buildings and structures completed in 1902
Buildings and structures in Cleveland County, Arkansas
National Register of Historic Places in Cleveland County, Arkansas